The Truth About Tigers is a 40-minute wildlife documentary produced by award-winning wildlife and conservation filmmaker, Shekar Dattatri. The film explains how the public can contribute towards saving the tiger.

Two years in the making, the film combines footage shot by some of the world's leading wildlife cinematographers with insight from experts such as tiger biologist, Dr. Ullas Karanth, of the Wildlife Conservation Society, and illegal wildlife trade specialist, Belinda Wright of the Wildlife Protection Society of India. The film shows a tiger's life from birth to death, and illustrates how human activities impact its conservation. The film uses material from sources including the BBC, Icon Films, conservation organizations, individual filmmakers and photographers. Actor, Roshan Seth, provides the narration, and a British documentary composer, David Mitcham, contributed a large proportion of the music.

References

External links
www.truthabouttigers.org Accompanying website that provides information on tigers and their conservation

Documentary films about nature
2010 films
2010 documentary films
Films about tigers
Wildlife conservation in India
Indian documentary films
Tigers in India